Jorunn Ringstad (3 September 1943 – 12 September 2018) was a Norwegian politician for the Centre Party.

She was elected to the Norwegian Parliament from Sogn og Fjordane in 1993, and was re-elected on two occasions. She had previously served in the position of deputy representative during the term 1989–1993.

Ringstad served as mayor of Askvoll municipality from 1987 to 1993.

References

1943 births
2018 deaths
Members of the Storting
Centre Party (Norway) politicians
Women members of the Storting
21st-century Norwegian politicians
21st-century Norwegian women politicians
20th-century Norwegian politicians
20th-century Norwegian women politicians